This is a list of Czech artists. These include artists in traditional media such as painting, sculpture, photography and printmaking as well as other genres, including installation art, performance art, conceptual art and video art.

A
Miroslav Adámek, (1957-2002), painter, illustrator
Mikoláš Aleš, (1852–1913), painter
Jiří Anderle, (born 1936), painter, graphic artist
Jaroslav Augusta, (1878-1970), painter 
Jan Autengruber, (1887-1920), painter

B
Helena Bochořáková-Dittrichová (1894–1980), graphic artist
Vladimír Boudník (1924–1968), photographer and graphic artist
Jaroslava Brychtová (1924-2020), glass artist and sculptor

C
David Černý (born 1967), sculptor

D
Dorrit Dekk (1917–2014), graphic designer, printmaker and painter
Jiri Georg Dokoupil (born 1954), painter

F
Emanuel Famíra (1900–1970), sculptor and painter

H
Vladimír Havlík (born 1959), action artist, painter
Vlastislav Hofman (1884–1964), painter, designer and architect
Alexandr Vladimír Hrska (1890-1954), painter, graphic designer, and scenographer

J
František Janák (born 1951), glass artist

K
Lukáš Kándl (born 1944), painter
Milan Knížák (born 1940), performance artist
Běla Kolářová (1923–2010), collagist and photographer
Marian Korn (1914-1987), printmaker
Věra Kotasová (1939–2019), painter, printmaker
Jan Kotík (1972–2007)
Ludvík Kuba (1863–1956), painter
Alena Kupčíková (born 1976), contemporary artist
Frantizek Kupka (23 September 1871 – 24 June 1957), painter, abstract expressionist
Vladimir Kokolia (born 1956)

L
Josef Lada (1887–1957), painter, illustrator

M
Martin Mainer (born 1959), painter
Adéla Matasová (born 1940), sculptor
Alena Matejka (born 1966), sculptor
Alphonse Mucha (born 1860) graphics artist, sculptor

O
Jakub Obrovský (1882–1949), sculptor
Eduard Ovčáček (born 1933), lettrist, graphic artist, sculptor, painter

S
Tom Samek (1950–2021), muralist
Malva Schalek (1882–1944), painter
Miloš Šejn (born 1947), performance artist
Jaroslava Severová (born 1942), printmaker
T. F. Šimon (1877–1942), painter, printmaker
František Skála (born 1956), sculptor, painter
Milena Šoltészová (born 1939), printmaker
Václav Špála (1885–1946) painter, graphic designer,  illustrator
Hana Storchová (born 1936), painter, printmaker
Viktor Stretti (1878–1957), engraver
Naděžda Synecká (1926–2021), printmaker

T
Karel Teige (1900–1951), graphic artist and photographer

V
Martin Velíšek (born 1963) glass artist, painter
Aleš Veselý (1935-2015), sculptor
Jiří Votruba (born 1946), designer, painter

W
Julie Wimmer (born 1975), designer

Z
Helen Zelezny-Scholz (1882–1974), sculptor
Ludmila Zeman (born 1947), Czech-Canadian animator
Kamila Ženatá (born 1953), installations, video art
Helena Zmatlíková (1923–2005), illustrator

See also

List of Czech painters
Lists of painters by nationality
Czech art
List of lists of painters by nationality

References

External links

Czech artists by date
Czech artists
Painters